Catumiri is a genus of South American tarantulas that was first described by J. P. L. Guadanucci in 2004. The name is derived from the Tupi "Catumiri", meaning "very small".

Description
Members of Catumiri have a labium that is much wider than long, and also houses few cuspules along with the maxillae. The anterior scopula is divided by setae, and the spermathecae of females only have one lobe/terminus. There is a row of spines on the prolateral region of the tarsal claw of males.

Species
 it contains 5 species, found in Uruguay, Brazil, Argentina, and Chile:
Catumiri argentinense (Mello-Leitão, 1941) – Chile, Argentina
Catumiri chicaoi Guadanucci, 2004 – Brazil
Catumiri parvum (Keyserling, 1878) – Brazil, Uruguay
Catumiri petropolium Guadanucci, 2004 (type) – Brazil
Catumiri sapucai (Nicoletta, Panchuk, Peralta-Seen & Ferretti, 2022) – Argentina

In synonymy:
C. uruguayense Guadanucci, 2004 = Catumiri parvum (Keyserling, 1878)

See also
 List of Theraphosidae species

References

Theraphosidae genera
Spiders of South America
Theraphosidae